Seen Art? is a children's picture book written by Jon Scieszka and illustrated by Lane Smith.  It was published in 2005 by Viking Press and Penguin Random House LLC, in cooperation with the Museum of Modern Art. It is aimed at a reading age of 4 to 8.

Plot
It depicts a child's view of the art collection at the Museum of Modern Art in New York City via a storyline that follows a young boy's quest for his friend called Art. Asking people whether they have seen Art, and where Art is, leads him on a journey around the Museum. At the end of the book he finds his friend waiting for him outside the Museum.

Translation
The book has been published in Spanish translation as En Busca de Arte.

References

American picture books
2005 children's books
Museum education
Museums in popular culture
Museum of Modern Art (New York City)
2005 in art
Books about art